Yaghoub Karimi (August 31, 1991) is an Iranian football midfielder.

Club career

Pas
He joined Pas in the summer 2003 from the youth academy. He played five seasons for Pas youth team.

Esteghlal
In summer 2009, Karimi joined Esteghlal. He played his first match for Esteghlal in 2010–11 season.

Naft Tehran
He played two seasons for Esteghlal and moved to Naft Tehran in the summer of 2011. Karimi played with Naft Tehran until 2013. He played in 54 games, scored 11 times and assists 14 goals. He was most value player for Naft Tehran in 2011–12 and 2012–13 seasons.

Sepahan
Naft Tehran and Sepahan reached agreement over transfer of Karimi in May 2013. He officially joined Sepahan on 1 July 2013 with a four-year contract and made his debut for his new team in a 2–0 win over Foolad.

Esteghlal
On 21 July 2014, Karimi joined Esteghlal with signing a loan contract until the end of the season. He played his first match for Esteghlal on ten days later against Rah Ahan, coming as a substitute for Khosro Heydari. On 27 July 2015, he signed a permanent contract with Esteghlal keeping him at the club until 2017.

Club career statistics

Assists

International career 
On 15 February 2012, Karimi named in Iran squad by Carlos Queiroz.  He named in Iran U23 final list for Incheon 2014.

International goals 
Scores and results list Iran's goal tally first.

Honours

Club
Esteghlal
Persian Gulf Pro League Runner up (2): 2010–11, 2016–17
Hazfi Cup Runner up (1): 2015–16

References

External links

 Yaghoub Karimi at Persian League
 

Iranian footballers
Living people
Esteghlal F.C. players
People from Kivi, Iran
1991 births
Persian Gulf Pro League players
Naft Tehran F.C. players
Iran under-20 international footballers
Iran international footballers
Association football midfielders
Footballers at the 2014 Asian Games
Asian Games competitors for Iran